The 1975 Championship of Australia was the 19th edition of the Championship of Australia, an ANFC-organised national club Australian rules football tournament between the champion clubs from the VFL, the SANFL, the WANFL and the Tasmanian State Premiership.

This was the last Championship of Australia title to be held before the competition was expanded the following year into the NFL Championship Series.

Qualified Teams

Venue

Fixtures

Semi-finals

Third-place play-off

Championship of Australia final 

Championship of Australia
Australian rules football competitions in Australia
Championship of Australia
Championship of Australia